Parilyrgis is a genus of moths of the family Erebidae. The genus was erected by George Thomas Bethune-Baker in 1908.

Species
Parilyrgis bisinuata (Hampson, 1926) Ambon Island
Parilyrgis brunneata (Bethune-Baker, 1908) New Guinea
Parilyrgis concolor Bethune-Baker, 1908 New Guinea
Parilyrgis fumosa (Hampson, 1926) Solomon Islands
Parilyrgis longirostris (Hampson, 1926) Bali
Parilyrgis nyctichroa (Turner, 1908) Queensland
Parilyrgis perfumida Hampson, 1926) New Guinea
Parilyrgis tacta (Holland, 1900) Buru

References

Calpinae
Moth genera